The Steckart and Falck Double Block is located in De Pere, Wisconsin, in the United States. It was added to the National Register of Historic Places in 2011.

History
The building was built in 1888 in the Italianate architecture style. One half of the building belonged to John Steckart, the other half belonged to Jacob Falck. The structure was built for them after a fire had destroyed their buildings earlier in the year. Each side held two stores and five apartments.

References

Commercial buildings on the National Register of Historic Places in Wisconsin
Italianate architecture in Wisconsin
Commercial buildings completed in 1888
National Register of Historic Places in Brown County, Wisconsin
De Pere, Wisconsin